Crystal Simorgh of Special Jury Prize is an award presented annually by the Fajr International Film Festival held in Iran.

Winners

Notes

References 

Special Jury Prize